Thomas Hanson Paynter (December 9, 1851March 8, 1921) was a United States Senator and Representative from Kentucky.

Born on a farm near Vanceburg, Kentucky, Paynter attended the common schools, Rand's Academy, and Centre College. There he studied law, was admitted to the bar in 1872, and commenced practice in Greenup, Kentucky. He served as the prosecuting attorney of Greenup County, Kentucky from 1876 to 1882, and then resumed the practice of law in Greenup.

Paynter was elected as a Democrat to the Fifty-first, Fifty-second, and Fifty-third Congresses in the U.S. House of Representatives, serving from March 4, 1889 until January 5, 1895. There he served as chairman of the U.S. House Committee on Expenditures in the Post Office Department. He resigned in 1895, having been elected as a judge of the Kentucky Court of Appeals, where he served from 1895 to 1906. He resigned from this position as well, having been elected a U.S. Senator.

Paynter served in the Senate from March 4, 1907 to March 3, 1913. He was not a candidate for reelection in 1912. In the Senate he served as chairman of the U.S. Senate Committee to Examine Branches of the Civil Service. After his career in politics, he moved to Frankfort, Kentucky in 1913 to continue the practice of law and follow agricultural pursuits. He died in Frankfort and was interred in the State Cemetery.

References 

1851 births
1921 deaths
Burials at Frankfort Cemetery
Kentucky state court judges
Kentucky lawyers
American prosecutors
Centre College alumni
Democratic Party United States senators from Kentucky
People from Lewis County, Kentucky
Democratic Party members of the United States House of Representatives from Kentucky
People from Greenup, Kentucky
People from Frankfort, Kentucky
19th-century American lawyers